Rocking Chair Butte is a summit in Fallon County, Montana, in the United States.

References

Mountains of Fallon County, Montana
Mountains of Montana